BB Sasore is a Nigerian screenwriter, film director, and co-founder of Nemsia Films. He is best known as the writer and director of God Calling, and Before 30.

Education
Sasore holds a degree with majors in  genetics and biochemistry from Rutgers University.

FilmographyGod CallingBanana Island GhostBefore 30 (2015)Journey of an African Colony''

See also
 List of Nigerian film directors

References

Living people
Nigerian film directors
Rutgers University alumni
Year of birth missing (living people)
Nigerian screenwriters
Nigerian entertainment industry businesspeople